Virginia's 15th House of Delegates district elects one of 100 seats in the Virginia House of Delegates, the lower house of the state's bicameral legislature. District 15 represents Page and Shenandoah counties, as well as parts of Warren and Rockingham counties. The seat is currently held by Todd Gilbert.

District officeholders

Electoral history

References

015
Shenandoah County, Virginia
Rockingham County, Virginia
Warren County, Virginia
Page County, Virginia